Alexander Elliot is a Canadian actor. He is known for starring as Joe Hardy on the 2020s television series adaptation The Hardy Boys, opposite Rohan Campbell as Frank.

Elliot is from Toronto. He began acting and dancing at six. He has appeared on the series Detention Adventure, Odd Squad, and Locke & Key, and the films Trapped: The Alex Cooper Story and Violent Night.

References

External links

Living people
Canadian male television actors
21st-century Canadian male actors
Year of birth missing (living people)